DeAndrey Abron (July 31, 1972 – March 7, 2020) was an American professional boxer who competed from 2004 to 2011 and challenged for the WBO and lineal light heavyweight titles in 2008. He served in the United States Army and won gold in the All Army/Armed Forces Championship from 1998 to 2003. Abron was team captain for the World Championships in 2001 and was an Olympic Team alternate in 2000.

He was killed in a car accident on March 8, 2020.

Amateur career
Abron was the National Amateur Light Heavyweight Champion in 2001 and was also the 2003 National Golden Gloves Light Heavyweight Champion.

Professional career
Abron turned pro in 2004. He challenged Zsolt Erdei for the WBO and lineal light heavyweight titles in Dresden, Germany, in April 2008, but lost by unanimous decision.

Professional boxing record

References

External links
 

1972 births
2020 deaths
Boxers from Youngstown, Ohio
Light-heavyweight boxers
Winners of the United States Championship for amateur boxers
American male boxers
African-American boxers
Road incident deaths in Ohio
United States Army soldiers
20th-century African-American sportspeople
21st-century African-American sportspeople
20th-century African-American people